Lower Cascades is a waterfall in North Central North Carolina, located in Hanging Rock State Park in Stokes County.

History
The falls was first seen by Europeans when German naturalist Lewis David von Schweinitz discovered it, and was originally named Schweinitz Falls (or Cascades).

Geology
The waterway is Cascades Creek, which flows through Hanging Rock State Park.  The falls has an overhanging bluff and a large plunge pool at the base.

Visiting the Falls
The falls are open to the public and are accessible beginning at a parking area on the side of Hall Road.  Visitors may take a moderate-difficulty 0.3-mile (.5 km) trail to the falls.  The trail used to be extremely difficult at the end with a dangerous cliff scramble, but has been made much easier by the addition of a set of stairs to the plunge pool.

Nearby Falls
Hanging Rock State Park hosts 4 other waterfalls:

Tory's Falls
Upper Cascades
Window Falls
Hidden Falls

External links
 North Carolina Waterfalls - Lower and Upper Cascades

References

Protected areas of Stokes County, North Carolina
Waterfalls of North Carolina
Waterfalls of Stokes County, North Carolina